Hans Gildemeister and Andrés Gómez were the defending champions, but both players decided to rest after competing in the Davis Cup the previous week.

Gary Donnelly and Peter Fleming won the title by defeating Laurie Warder and Blaine Willenborg 6–2, 7–6 in the final.

Seeds
The first four seeds received a bye to the second round.

Draw

Finals

Top half

Bottom half

References

External links
 Official results archive (ATP)
 Official results archive (ITF)

1987 Grand Prix (tennis)